The Millville Traction Company operated streetcars in Millville, New Jersey, and along an interurban streetcar line to Vineland, New Jersey, along Main Road (now CR 555) and Landis Avenue.

History
The company was chartered in 1894 and opened its main line on August 1, 1901. Also in 1901, the Millville Rapid Transit Company, which had been leased, was merged into the Millville Traction Company.

See also
List of New Jersey street railroads

References
Railroad History Database

New Jersey streetcar lines
Transport companies established in 1894
Defunct New Jersey railroads
Interurban railways in New Jersey
1894 establishments in New Jersey